The National Retail Federation (NRF) is the world's largest retail trade association.  Its members include department stores, specialty, discount, catalog, Internet, and independent retailers, chain restaurants, grocery stores, and multi-level marketing companies. Members also include businesses that provide goods and services to retailers, such as vendors and technology providers. NRF represents the largest private-sector industry in the United States that contains over 3.8 million retail establishments, supporting more than 52 million employees contributing $2.6 trillion annually to GDP.

History
The NRF began in 1911 as the National Retail Dry Goods Association (NRDGA). This was also the year of its first annual meeting.  In 1958, NRDGA was renamed the National Retail Merchants Association. In 1990, the association and the American Retail Federation merged to form the National Retail Federation. During all the years, an annual convention was held for members. The National Retail Federation (NRF) is the world's largest retail trade association, with members including department store, specialty, discount, catalogue, Internet, and independent retailers, chain restaurants, and grocery stores. It is also an umbrella group that represents more than 100 associations of state, national and international retailers.

Lobbying
NRF, along with the Americans for Free Trade coalition, educated Congress, the administration, the press and consumers about the harmful economic impact of the trade war with China. NRF testified before the administration, held dozens of meetings on Capitol Hill, participated in press conferences and conducted media interviews to break down tariffs’ complicated negative effect on businesses and consumers.

NRF organized the Main Street Privacy Coalition, composed of trade groups that represent companies using customers’ data for first-party use only, like retailers, hotels, grocery stores and restaurants. In November 2019, NRF and the coalition called on lawmakers to adopt a “uniform and fair framework” that applies nationwide and covers all entities that handle sensitive data. Principles for privacy legislation were presented to both House and Senate committees.

2018 
After fighting for online sales tax collection in Congress and the courts for over 15 years, NRF welcomed a Supreme Court ruling in South Dakota v. Wayfair, Inc. allowing states to require online sellers to collect sales tax the same as local stores. The ruling came after NRF submitted friend-of-the-court briefs in the case arguing that modern software had removed any burden once associated with collecting sales tax and that the lack of sales tax collection had given online sellers an unfair price advantage over local stores.

NRF and other groups seeking patent reform won when the Supreme Court upheld a process that allows questionable patents to be reviewed administratively rather than requiring litigation. The ruling will help rein in “patent trolls,” which have targeted retailers with frivolous lawsuits over off-the-shelf technology and routine practices like attaching a file to an email.

2017 
The NRF successfully lobbied for passage of long-sought comprehensive tax reform that lowered rates for individuals and businesses alike, and said the measure would help create jobs while leaving workers with more take-home pay. During the year-long debate, NRF defeated a proposed “border adjustment tax” that would have driven up the price of imported consumers goods by 20 percent and which nearly sidetracked tax reform. The NRF's campaign against the import tax was highlighted by an award-winning infomercial-style television ad aired on Saturday Night Live that explained how the tax would raise prices and kill jobs.

In late 2013 David French, the NRF's senior director of government relations, said the organization would start distributing campaign contributions in Republican primary elections to oppose the Tea Party movement and adjust to the "changing environment on Capitol Hill" that has contributed to what he called "the three-ring circus that has transfixed Washington." “We are looking at ways to counter the rise of an ideological brand of conservatism that, for lack of a better word, is more anti-establishment than it has been in the past,” French said. “We have come to the conclusion that sitting on the sidelines is not good enough.”

In April 2014, the United States Senate debated the Minimum Wage Fairness Act (S. 1737; 113th Congress). The bill would amend the Fair Labor Standards Act of 1938 (FLSA) to increase the federal minimum wage for employees to $10.10 per hour over the course of a two-year period. The bill was strongly supported by President Barack Obama and many of the Democratic Senators, but strongly opposed by Republicans in the Senate and House. The NRF opposed the bill, saying that "raising the standard of living for low-skill, low-wage workers is a valid goal," but that "there is clear evidence that mandate wage hikes undermine the job prospects for less skilled and part-time workers." The trade group also argued that this was the "least opportune moment" to increase the minimum wage because employers were still dealing with the fallout of changes they needed to make because of the Affordable Care Act ("Obamacare").

NRF supported legislation passed by the House to repeal the Affordable Care Act and its employer mandate, which requires businesses to provide workers with health insurance at levels dictated by the government. Since passed in 2010, the law has forced some retailers to keep payrolls below the 50-worker level for triggering the law and to keep workers below the 30-hour a week definition of full time that requires coverage. The measure passed the House but died in the Senate.

NRF defeated an effort to repeal debit card swipe fee reform that has saved retailers and their customers an estimated $8 billion a year since 2011, blocking an effort to allow the card industry to resume price-fixing of debit card fees.

NRF helped convince the Department of Labor to reverse an expanded definition of “joint employer” that exposed companies to easier unionization and increased lawsuits over labor disputes. The NLRB also reversed a ruling that allowed the creation of “micro-unions” that would have allowed individual stores within a retail chain to be separately unionized or even individual departments within a store.

NRF Senior Vice President for Government Relations, David French, was named a top lobbyist by The Hill newspaper for the seventh year running.

2016 
NRF led the retail industry in helping defeat proposed regulations that would have required companies to pay overtime to millions of more workers. The rules would have driven up costs for employers, and the NRF argued that it would also take away worker flexibility important to career advancement and result in little or no increases in actual take-home pay. NRF challenged the law in a suit with 21 states and dozens of business groups resulting in an injunction that kept the proposed expansion from taking place.

Conferences
In 2018, Big Show had more than 300 speakers, 500 exhibitors, 36,500 attendees and 500 sessions. In 2019, Big Show had 500 speakers, 700 exhibitors, 37,000 attendees and 500 sessions.

In 2020, Big Show had more than 300 speakers, 800 exhibitors, 40,000 attendees and 200 sessions.

Leadership 
In mid-March 2010, the NRF announced that Matt Shay, who had headed the International Franchise Association (IFA), would become NRF's president and CEO on May 10, 2010, replacing Tracy Mullin, who was retiring.   Mullin joined NRF in 1976 and became president in 1993. Shay joined the IFA in 1993 and was named president in 2004 and chief executive in 2007.

During his time at the helm, Shay is credited with doubling the organization's revenue. The largest revenue source, conferences and conventions like the Big Show and Shop.org, increased by nearly two and a half times, and its net assets have quadrupled, according to information provided to Retail Dive from the NRF. The organization's membership base has grown up to 18,000 retailers today, many of which are small businesses. Shay also notably brought on Walmart in 2013 after decades of courting.

Retail sales
The National Retail Federation releases figures on the sales for each Thanksgiving weekend. In 2018, the NRF projected that retail industry sales will grow between 3.8 and 4.4 percent over 2017. In 2019, the NRF projected that retail industry sales will grow between 3.8 and 4.4 percent over 2018.

Annual retail sales

Holiday sales

COVID-19 Pandemic 
Throughout the COVID-19 pandemic, NRF has asked the federal government to step in to support retailers coping with a serious downturn in discretionary spending. In March, NRF called for mandatory default and foreclosure stays or federally ordered rent abatement to relieve retailers faced with closure orders.

NRF also suggested government-backed loans and tax relief, including reinstatement of the net operating loss carryback, assistance with payroll costs, and expansion of employee retention tax credits to retailers with financial losses related to the decline in purchases of most goods beyond food and other essentials.

In July, NRF asked for further financial assistance for retailers in a letter to congressional leadership. The letter requested an increase in funding to loan and financial assistance programs to help retailers retain employees, including expediting the Paycheck Protection Program loan forgiveness for all loans up to $150,000.

In response to the COVID-19 pandemic, NRF's educational arm, the NRF Foundation, offered its introductory training course, Retail Industry Fundamentals, for free. This was done to support individuals applying for the almost 1 million jobs posted by U.S. retailers. NRF compiled those positions on its website job board.

National associations and members represented
The NRF has about 18,000 members, including department, specialty, discount, catalog, Internet, independent stores, chain restaurants, drug stores and grocery stores. Among the notable associations that are members of the NRF in its role as an umbrella organization are:
 American Booksellers Association
 Direct Selling Association
 Food Marketing Institute
 International Franchise Association
 National Association of Convenience Stores

References 

Trade associations based in the United States
Retail trade associations
Organizations established in 1911
1911 establishments in the United States